Chandulal Chandrakar University of Journalism and Mass Communication (Proposed Name) is a journalism and mass communication university located in Raipur in the Indian state of Chhattisgarh. Earlier known as Kushabhau Thakre University of Journalism and Mass Communication (KTUJM). The University established by Government of Chhattisgarh vide Act no 24 of 2004. The University foundation day is now celebrated on 16 April every year. In 2020, the newly formed Government in Chhattisgarh decided to change its name to Chandulal Chandrakar Patrakarita Avam Jansanchar Vishwavidyala which is under political disputed between State and the Governor of Chhattisgarh

Campus 
The university is located at a self-contained campus at Kathadih Raipur.  Kathadih village is situated some six kilometres from Bhatagaon, which stands on National Highway 6, near Sunder Nagar, Raipur. It is roughly 16 km away from the railway station.  Mana (Raipur) airport is around 15 km. Auto Rickshaw charges Rs. 250 from the railway station. The present campus has  office, classrooms, faculty rooms, library, Computer lab, Language lab, Television Studio, Community Radio and other necessary infrastructure with hostel for boys and girls.

Courses 
This university specialise in providing professional graduate programs in the field of Journalism, mass communication and electronic media. The following are the courses provided by the institution:
 Bachelor of Journalism & Mass Communication
Bachelor of Science in Electronic Media
 Master of Journalism 
 Master of Arts in Advertising & Public Relations
 Master of Science (Electronic Media)
 Master of Arts in Mass Communication
 Master of Social Work
 Master in Business Administration (Media Management)
 Master in Business Administration (Hospital Administration)
 Master in Business Administration (Human Resource Development)
 Doctor of Philosophy (Journalism, Communication, Electronic Media, Advertising, Public Relations)
 Master of Philosophy (Media Studies)
 Master of Philosophy (Mass Communication)
 Post Graduate Diploma in Digital Video Production
 Post Graduate Diploma in Graphics and Animation
 Post Graduate Diploma in Event Management
 Post Graduate Diploma in Journalism
 Post Graduate Diploma in Corporate Communication

References

External links 
 Kushabhau Thakre University of Journalism and Mass Communication

Universities and colleges in Chhattisgarh
Journalism schools in India
Education in Raipur, Chhattisgarh
2005 establishments in Chhattisgarh
Educational institutions established in 2005